Rostand may refer to:

People
 André Rostand, Malagasy politician
 Edmond Rostand (1868–1918), French poet and dramatist
 Jean Rostand (1894–1977), French biologist and philosopher, son of Edmond
 Maurice Rostand (1883–1946), French playwright, son of Edmond
 Rostand Melaping (born 1978), Cameroonian judoka

Places
 Rostand Island, an island in Antarctica named for Jean Rostand

See also
Rostagnus, for the given name Rostand